Glenwood Historic District may refer to:

Glenwood Historic District (Thomasville, Georgia), listed on the National Register of Historic Places (NRHP) in Thomas County
Glenwood Historic District (Chattanooga, Tennessee), NRHP-listed in Hamilton County
Glenwood Historic District (Clarksville, Tennessee), NRHP-listed in Montgomery County

See also
Glenwood (disambiguation)